Allen Temple A.M.E. Church is a historic church at 109 Green Avenue at the junction with S. Markley Street in Greenville, South Carolina.

It was built in 1929 in a Classical Revival style and was added to the National Register of Historic Places in 2008.

References

African Methodist Episcopal churches in South Carolina
Churches on the National Register of Historic Places in South Carolina
Neoclassical architecture in South Carolina
Churches completed in 1929
Churches in Greenville County, South Carolina
National Register of Historic Places in Greenville, South Carolina
Neoclassical church buildings in the United States